The Benin River is a river that flows through the south west of Nigeria.

The river starts under the name "Ethiope" in the south east of the state Edo. Subsequently, it runs through various cities and villages, such as Umutu, Owah Abbi, Obiaruku, Abraka, Igun Watershed, Idjerhe Kingdom, Sapele, Mosogar and Koko. Near Sapele the Ethiope continues into the Benin. From here on the river widens into a small estuary and discharges into the Gulf of Guinea.

Benin is partly a branch of the Niger, as the two rivers are connected through a few streams.

References 

Rivers of Nigeria